Bing Wing Thom,  (Chinese: 譚秉榮; 8 December 1940 – 4 October 2016) was a Canadian architect and urban designer. Born in Hong Kong, he immigrated to Vancouver, British Columbia, Canada with his family in 1950. His paternal grandfather originally immigrated to Vancouver in the 1890s and his father was born in New Westminster before moving to Hong Kong after being unable to practice as a pharmacist in Canada.

Career
Thom received a Bachelor of Architecture in 1966 from the University of British Columbia and a Master of Architecture in 1970 from the University of California, Berkeley.

He moved to Tokyo in 1971 to work for Japanese architect-urbanist Fumihiko Maki.  Returning to Canada in 1972, he joined Arthur Erickson Architects as project director and oversaw projects such as Roy Thomson Hall in Toronto (1977), the Robson Square Courthouse Complex in Vancouver (1973–1979) and the Air Defence Ministry Building in Jeddah, Saudi Arabia.

In 1981, Thom established his own architecture firm, Vancouver-based Bing Thom Architects. In 1995, Thom was made a Member of the Order of Canada and he was a recipient of the Golden Jubilee Medal for outstanding service to his country. He was a Fellow of the Royal Architectural Institute of Canada. Thom received honorary degrees from the University of British Columbia and Simon Fraser University.

In 2010, Thom and his firm were awarded the Royal Architectural Institute of Canada's Architectural Firm of the Year award. and in 2011 he was awarded the RAIC's highest honour, the RAIC Gold Medal.

Thom died at age 75 of a brain aneurysm while on a trip to Hong Kong in October 2016.

Bing Thom Architects
As of 2015 the firm has a total staff of 47, including principals Venelin Kokalov and Shinobu Homma, directors, registered architects, architectural graduate and students, urban designers and planners, and support staff.

The firm specializes in urban planning and complex building types such as civic buildings, performing arts centres and public spaces. Typically projects are mixed-use, integrating commercial, residential and cultural uses to create a sustainable whole. They have offices in Vancouver, Hong Kong, and Washington, DC.

Architectural and urban design projects

Awards and prizes
Lieutenant-Governor of British Columbia Medal for Excellence in Architecture, AIBC (Guildford Aquatic Centre, Surrey British Columbia) 2016
Lieutenant-Governor of British Columbia Certificate of Merit for Excellence in Architecture, AIBC (Surrey City Centre Public Library, Surrey British Columbia) 2013
Top 25 Canadian Immigrant Award Winner 2012
Royal Architectural Institute of Canada Gold Medal 2011
Lieutenant-Governor of British Columbia Certificate of Merit, AIBC (SAIT Polytechnic Parkade) 2011
Royal Architectural Institute of Canada Architectural Firm Award 2010
Lieutenant-Governor of British Columbia Certificate of Merit for Excellence in Architecture, AIBC (Aberdeen Centre, Richmond British Columbia) 2007
Excellence on the Waterfront Awards – Top Honor, The Waterfront Center, Washington DC (The Trinity Uptown Plan, Fort Worth OK) 2005 
Merit Awards, Landscape Analysis & Planning, Boston Society of Landscape Architects (The Trinity Uptown Plan, Fort Worth OK) 2005
Marche International des Professionels de l'Immobilier (Cannes, France) Special Jury Prize (Surrey Central City, Surrey, British Columbia) 2004 
Lieutenant-Governor of British Columbia Medal in Architecture, AIBC (Surrey Central City, Surrey British Columbia) 2004 
Architectural Institute of British Columbia Innovation Award (Surrey Central City, Surrey BC) 2004 
CIP Award for Planning Excellence, Canadian Institute of Planners (Conceptual Development Plan for the City Center of Yuxi, China) 2001
Lieutenant-Governor of British Columbia Medal, AIBC (Pacific Canada Pavilion, Vancouver Aquarium, Vancouver) 2000 
Architectural Institute of British Columbia Innovation Award (Pacific Canada Pavilion, Vancouver Aquarium, Vancouver) 2000
Lieutenant-Governor of British Columbia Medal, AIBC (Chan Centre for the Performing Arts, Vancouver BC) 1998 
USITT Merit Award, United States Institute for Theater Technology (Chan Centre for the Performing Arts, Vancouver BC) 1998 
Winner, Canadian National Selection (Canada Pavilion, Seville Expo '92, Spain) 1992
Lieutenant-Governor of British Columbia Medal, AIBC (False Creek Yacht Club/Anderson's Restaurant, Vancouver) 1992 
Governor General Medal, Royal Architectural Institute of Canada (Point Grey Road Condominiums, Vancouver) 1990
Governor General Medal, Royal Architectural Institute of Canada (False Creek Yacht Club/Anderson's Restaurant, Vancouver ) 1990
Excellence on the Waterfront Award, The Waterfront Center, Washington DC (False Creek Yacht Club / Anderson's Restaurant, Vancouver) 1990

Publications

 Bing Thom Architects, Bing Thom Works, Princeton Architectural Press, 2011
 Roan, Neill Archer, Scale + Timbre, The Chan Centre for the Performing Arts, Black Dog Publishing, 2002
 Bing Thom Architects, Canada Pavilion: Expo '92 Seville, Spain, Bing Thom Architects, Inc., 1992

References

External links
 Bing Thom Architects web site
 Bing Wing Thom at Encyclopedia of Music in Canada
 Bing Thom speaking on Vancouver's development at an SFU City Program lecture (1 February 2008, mp3 link)
 The Chan Centre for the Performing Arts
 Arena Stage, Washington DC
 Surrey Central City
 Simon Fraser University Surrey
 Aberdeen Centre

1940 births
2016 deaths
Businesspeople from Vancouver
Canadian architects
Hong Kong emigrants to Canada
Members of the Order of Canada
Naturalized citizens of Canada
University of British Columbia Faculty of Applied Science alumni
UC Berkeley College of Environmental Design alumni
Architecture firms of Canada
Companies based in Vancouver